The Geely Emgrand L and the previous Geely Emgrand GL are small family cars produced by Chinese auto brand Geely under the Emgrand product series. The Emgrand GL was produced from 2016 and the Emgrand L was produced from 2022 as an heavily updated version. 



First generation (Emgrand GL)

The Emgrand GL was launched in 2016 by Geely with prices ranging from 78,800 yuan to 113,800 yuan. Despite the styling difference, mechanically, the Emgrand GL is the sedan version of the Emgrand GS hatchback.

2018 facelift
The Emgrand GL received a facelift for the 2018 model year. The updated model continues to use the 1.8-litre naturally aspirated engine, while replacing the 1.3-litre turbo engine with a 1.4-litre turbo engine. Transmission options include a 6-speed manual transmission or a 6-speed DCT gearbox.

2020 facelift
The Emgrand GL received another facelift in 2020 slightly updating the front fascia and rear end designs. The engine is a 1.4-litre turbo engine and a 1.5-litre turbo engine producing  and  respectively. Transmission is a 6-speed manual transmission or a CVT, and an additional 7-speed DCT gearbox option for the 1.5-litre turbo engine.

Additional features are a 10.25 inch screen for the center console, the GKUI19 infotainment system with the integration of up to 5 personal devices connecting to hot spot at the same time, a 7-inch digital cluster, CN95 high efficiency air filter, intelligence cruise control, intelligent navigation, lane-keeping assist, AEB-P collision prevention system, speed limit recognition, and intelligent automatic high low beam control.

Emgrand GL EV Pro

Maple 60S
In 2022 Geely announced the launch of the Maple 60S, Geely’s first battery swap enabled electric sedan, produced in association with Lifan and based on the Geely Emgrand GL.

Second generation (Emgrand L)

The Emgrand L launched in December 2021 as an extensive facelift of the Emgrand GL it replaces. The Emgrand L features a completely redesigned front and rear end featuring Geely's updated Energy Storm design language previewed by the Vision Starburst concept.

The Emgrand L features a 12.3-inch infotainment display that runs on the latest FOTA cloud intelligence upgrade enabled Geely Galaxy OS shared with the Xingyue L. The Geely Galaxy OS runs on ECARX’s E02 eight-core system-on-a-chip (SoC) and features an AI-based voice control system with multiple occupant support, three-finger flying screen gesture control, over-the-air firmware updates, smartphone remote control support, and an eight-speaker sound system tuned by DTS.

Emgrand L Hi·X
A plug-in hybrid variant called the Emgrand L Hi·X (Emgrand L Leishen Hi·X) was launched in April 2022. The Emgrand L Hi·X is the first vehicle to be equipped with the Leishen intelligent engine system including a 1.5-litre TD engine mated with the 3-speed DHT Pro gearbox.

Emgrand L Hi·P
The transmission is a 3-speed DHT gearbox.

References

GL
Mid-size cars
Front-wheel-drive vehicles
Sedans
Cars introduced in 2016
2010s cars
Cars of China
Production electric cars